Daniel Bruce Gossett (born November 9, 1941 in Canonsburg, Pennsylvania) is a former National Football League placekicker from 1964-1974. He was in the Pro Bowl twice. He scored at least 100 points in six of his seasons. He was first-team Sporting News All-NFL in 1964 and 1966, All-NFC in 1973, and Sporting News first-team All-NFC in 1973. He scored 1,031 points in an 11-year NFL career, and was 6th on the NFL's all-time scoring list when he retired. 

While playing for the Rams he resided in Fountain Valley, Orange County, California, where he was a charter member of the Kiwanis Club chapter in the mid-1960s.  

In his 11-year NFL career (1964-1974), Gossett never missed a game, playing in 154 consecutive contests.

External link

1941 births
Living people
American football placekickers
Ferrum Panthers football players
Los Angeles Rams players
People from Canonsburg, Pennsylvania
Players of American football from Pennsylvania
Richmond Spiders football players
San Francisco 49ers players
Western Conference Pro Bowl players